John Higgs is an English writer, novelist, journalist and cultural historian. The work of Higgs has been published in the form of novels (under the pseudonym JMR Higgs), biographies and works of cultural history.

In particular, Higgs has written about the so-called counterculture, exemplified by writers, artists and activists such as Timothy Leary, Robert Anton Wilson, Alan Moore and The KLF.

Career
Higgs began as a director of children’s television and was BAFTA-nominated for pre-school animation before going on to create and produce the BBC Radio 4 quiz X Marks the Spot. At Climax Group studios he was videogame producer for games that appeared on Xbox, PS2 and GameCube including Crash 'n' Burn and ATV Quad Power Racing.

Higgs has written for The Guardian, The Independent, The Daily Mirror and Mojo magazine.

As an author, Higgs has written the novels The First Church on the Moon and The Brandy of the Damned; biographies of Timothy Leary and The KLF; and works of history and cultural analysis.

Born in Rugby, Higgs grew up in Buckley, North Wales and now lives with his family in Brighton.

Robert Anton Wilson, Illuminatus! and Cosmic Trigger
In his 2013 book, KLF, Higgs’s interest in the American counter culture writer Robert Anton Wilson led to him writing about the stage play version of Wilson's The Illuminatus Trilogy! books as directed by Ken Campbell and which were performed at the National Theatre in 1977. During Higgs’s research, he interviewed Campbell’s wife, the actress Prunella Gee, and learned that their daughter, Daisy Eris Campbell, was at the time thinking about staging a theatrical version of Wilson's Cosmic Trigger. Higgs supported and championed the production of the play with various talks around the country and the play was eventually staged in Liverpool and London in 2014 and staged again at The Cockpit Theatre in London in 2017.

Higgs involvement in the Cosmic Trigger play led to Robert Anton Wilson's estate – the Robert Anton Wilson Trust – to ask him to write an introduction for a new edition of Cosmic Trigger: The Final Secret of the Illuminati, published by the Wilson estate's new imprint, Hilaritas Press, in 2016.

Books

Biographies and history
  Love and Let Die: Bond, The Beatles and the British Psyche (Weidenfeld & Nicolson, 2022)
 William Blake vs the World (Weidenfeld & Nicolson, 2021)
 William Blake Now: Why He Matters More Than Ever (Hachette UK, 2019)
 The Future Starts Here: Adventures in the Twenty-First Century (Weidenfeld & Nicolson, 2019)
Watling Street: Travels Through Britain and Its Ever-Present Past (Weidenfeld & Nicolson, 2017)
Stranger Than We Can Imagine: Making Sense of the Twentieth Century (Weidenfeld & Nicolson, 2016)
 2000TC: Standing On The Verge Of Getting It On (2014), in a limited edition of 111 copies
The KLF: Chaos, Magic and the Band who Burned a Million Pounds (Weidenfeld & Nicolson, 2013)
I Have America Surrounded: The Life of Timothy Leary (The Friday Project, 2006)
Our Pet Queen: A New Perspective on Monarchy (Signal, 2014)

Fictional works as JMR Higgs
The First Church on the Moon (The Big Hand Books, 2013)
The Brandy of the Damned (The Big Hand Books, 2012)

Contributor
 Cosmic Trigger - The Final Secret of the Illuminati - Introduction by John Higgs (Hilaritas Press, 2016)
 Who Killed the KLF? (Documentary)

References

External links
 Website
 John Higgs at Orion Publishing Group
 John Higgs at Weidenfeld & Nicolson
 Interview with John Higgs
 Interview by The Quietus
 Video interview on The Agenda
 Interview by The Bookseller about Watling Street
 Presentation at the University of Kent on the legacy of Timothy Leary
 Video of Alan Moore and John Higgs in conversation
 KLF: Chaos, Magic, Music, Money review by The Quietus

1974 births
British male journalists
English columnists
English writers
English sceptics
Living people
The Guardian journalists